Neo4j is a graph database management system developed by Neo4j, Inc. Described by its developers as an ACID-compliant transactional database with native graph storage and processing, Neo4j is available in a non-open-source "community edition" licensed with a modification of the GNU General Public License, with online backup and high availability extensions licensed under a closed-source commercial license. Neo also licenses Neo4j with these extensions under closed-source commercial terms.

Neo4j is implemented in Java and accessible from software written in other languages using the Cypher query language through a transactional HTTP endpoint, or through the binary "Bolt" protocol. The "4j" in Neo4j is a reference to its being built in Java, however is now largely viewed as an anachronism.

History
Version 1.0 was released in February 2010.

Neo4j version 2.0 was released in December 2013.

Neo4j version 3.0 was released in April 2016.

In November 2016, Neo4j successfully secured $36M in Series D Funding led by Greenbridge Partners Ltd.

In November 2018, Neo4j successfully secured $80M in Series E Funding led by One Peak Partners and Morgan Stanley Expansion Capital, with participation from other investors including Creandum, Eight Roads and Greenbridge Partners.

In June 2021, Neo4j announced another round of funding, $325M in Series F.

Release history

Licensing and editions 
Neo4j comes in five editions. Two are on-premises editions, Community (free) and Enterprise, and three are cloud-only editions: AuraDB Free, AuraDB Professional, and AuraDB Enterprise.

It is dual-licensed: GPL v3 (with parts of the code under AGPLv3 with Commons Clause), and a proprietary license. The Community Edition is free but is limited to running on one node only due to the lack of clustering and is without hot backups.

The Enterprise Edition unlocks these limitations, allowing for clustering, hot backups, and monitoring. The Enterprise Edition is available under a closed-source Commercial license.

Data structure 
In Neo4j, everything is stored in the form of an edge, node, or attribute. Each node and edge can have any number of attributes. Both nodes and edges can be labelled. Labels can be used to narrow searches. As of version 2.0, indexing was added to Cypher with the introduction of schemas. Previously, indexes were supported separately from Cypher.

Neo4j, Inc.
Neo4j is developed by Neo4j, Inc., based in San Mateo, California, United States, and also in Malmö, Sweden. The Neo4j, Inc. board of directors consists of Michael Treskow (Eight Roads), Emanuel Lang (Greenbridge), Christian Jepsen (Sunstone), Denise Persson (CMO of Snowflake), David Klein (One Peak), Nathalie Kornhoff-Brüls (Eurazeo), Patrick Pichette (Inovia Capital and former CFO of Google), and Emil Eifrem (CEO of Neo4j).

See also 

 CODASYL
Cypher (query language)
 Gremlin (query language)

References

External links
 

Graph databases
Structured storage
Free database management systems
Software companies of Sweden
Free software programmed in Java (programming language)
2007 software
NoSQL
Software using the GNU AGPL license